Chuzhou or Chu Prefecture was a zhou (prefecture) in imperial China, centering on modern Lishui, Zhejiang, China. It existed (intermittently) from 589 to 1276, when the Yuan dynasty renamed it Chuzhou Route.

References
 

Prefectures of Wuyue
Prefectures of the Tang dynasty
Liangzhe East Circuit
Former prefectures in Zhejiang